Daniel Elsner was the defending champion, but was unable to compete in Juniors as he turned 18 years old.

Fernando González won the title by defeating Juan Carlos Ferrero 4–6, 6–4, 6–3 in the final. González became the first Chilean player to win this tournament, and the only one until 2013 after it was won by Cristian Garín.

Draw

Finals

Top half

Section 1

Section 2

Bottom half

Section 3

Section 4

References

External links
 Official results archive (ITF)

Boys' Singles
1998